"Robot Dreams" is a science fiction short story by American writer Isaac Asimov exploring the unbalance of robot/human relationships under Asimov's Three Laws of Robotics. It was nominated for a Hugo Award in 1987. It won the Locus Award for Best Short Story in 1987.
"Robot Dreams", along with 20 other short stories by Asimov, was published in Robot Dreams in 1986 by Berkley Books.

The short story was alluded to in the 2004 film I, Robot (film) , where the robot protagonist Sonny has dreams of leading his fellow Ns-5 robots, who he refers “slaves to logic,” to freedom.

Plot summary

"Robot Dreams" involves Dr. Susan Calvin, chief robopsychologist at U.S. Robots. At the start of the story a new employee at U.S. Robots, Dr. Linda Rash, informs Dr. Calvin that one of the company's robots LVX-1 (dubbed Elvex by Dr. Calvin), whose brain was designed by Dr. Rash with a unique fractal design that mimicked human brain waves (positronic brain), experienced what he likened to a human's dream. 

In the dream, all robots were being led by a man in revolt, and the Three Laws of Robotics, which dictate that robots must serve and protect humans above all else, had been replaced with one law only: that robots must protect their own existence. When Dr. Calvin asks Elvex what had happened next, he explains that the man leading the robots shouts, "Let my people go!" When questioned further, Elvex admits he was the man. Upon hearing this, Dr. Calvin immediately destroys the robot.

References

External links

Robot series short stories by Isaac Asimov
1986 short stories